The Braeburn Range is a mountain range in the Tasman Region of New Zealand's South Island. It lies to the west of Lake Rotoroa and much of the eastern flank of the range is within the Nelson Lakes National Park. The range runs south-southeast, with a westwards curve at the northern end and several westward-trending spurs.

The northernmost and highest peak of the range is the  Mount Murchison overlooking the Buller River. The southern endpoint of the range is Mount Hutton above the Tiraumea Saddle. The higher Ella Range lies to the south. Other peaks include Mount Pickering, Mount Cotton, Mount Baring, and Twins. There is a radio and television transmission mast on top of Mount Murchison.

The area above the bush line on Mount Murchison is one of three isolated habitats for an as-yet unnamed species of large alpine carnivorous land snail, currently known as Powelliphanta "Nelson Lakes". Living beneath tussocks and mountain flax, these snails have survived summer grazing by sheep and cattle in the past. Pigs are still considered a threat.  A more widespread variety, Powelliphanta "Matakitaki" is found in bush above 1200 metres south of Mount Murchison. It is also the only known site of Veronica societatis, a small grassland hebe first discovered by members of the Nelson Botanical Society and named after the society in 2002. 

The area is popular for hunting, with red deer, pigs, chamois and goats to be found. The Tiraumea tramping track crosses the saddle at the southern end of the range, following the Tiraumea River.

References

Mountain ranges of the Tasman District